Jalaa, also known as Cèntûm, Centúúm or Cen Tuum, is an extinct language of northeastern Nigeria (Loojaa settlement in Balanga Local Government Area, Gombe State), of uncertain origins, apparently a language isolate. The Jalabe (as descendants of speakers of the language are called) speak the Bwilim dialect of the Dikaka language. It is possible (but unconfirmed) that some remembered words have been retained for religious ceremonies, but in 1992 only a few elders remember words that their parents had used, and by 2010 there may not even remain any such rememberers.

The Jalabe are said to have come to Loojaa from an area a few miles south within the Muri Mountains, where they had shared a settlement with Tso and Kwa clans. (The name of this settlement, Cèntûm or Cùntûm, is used as a name for the language in some sources. Jalaa elders differ in whether they believe Jalaa or Centum/Cuntum was their original name for themselves.) Later, during the nineteenth century, the Dikaka arrived in the area, fleeing attacks from the larger Waja to the north; the Cham intermarried with the Jalabe, and the Jalabe began to adopt the Dikaka language.

Phonology

Lexicon
The Jalaa lexicon is also strongly influenced by Dikaka (which it has in turn influenced); some similarities are also found with the nearby Tso. However, most of its vocabulary is extremely unusual. In Kleinewillinghöfer's words, "The major part of the lexicon seems to differ entirely from all the surrounding languages, which themselves represent different language families."

Both Dikaka and the Tso traditionally avoided using names of the dead. When those names were also words of the language, as often happened, this forced them to change the word, sometimes by replacing it with a word from a neighboring language. Kleinewillinghöfer regards this as a motivation for certain cases of borrowing from Jalaa into Dikaka.

Numerals

The numerals 1-6 in Jalaa are:

 
 , 
 , 
 , 
 
 

Above 5, the numerals are almost identical to Dikaka. The numerals 2 through 5 are almost identical with Tso, while "one" has no clear cognates.

Morphology

Jalaa morphology (at least in its present form) is almost identical to that of Cham. The main differences in the noun class system are two of the plural suffixes: Jalaa  versus Cham  and (for humans) Jalaa ,  versus Cham .

Noun morphology is similar to that of Cham, but with some differences. Some sample singular and plural noun sets in Jalaa and Cham:

See also

 Bung language
 Komta language

Bibliography

References

Languages of Nigeria
Endangered languages of Africa
Endangered language isolates
Language isolates of Africa